The 2019 Superliga Colombiana (known as the 2019 Superliga Águila for sponsorship purposes) was the eighth edition of the Superliga Colombiana. It was contested by the champions of the 2018 Categoría Primera A season from 23 to 27 January 2019.

Junior won their first Superliga title following a 3–0 win on penalty kicks against Deportes Tolima, after tying 2–2 on aggregate score.

Teams

Matches

First leg

Second leg

Tied 2–2 on aggregate, Junior won on penalty kicks.

References

External links
Superliga on Dimayor's website

Superliga Colombiana
Superliga Colombiana
Superliga Colombiana